Jean-Claude Wuillemin (22 June 1943 – 2 November 1993) was a French cyclist. He competed in the team time trial at the 1964 Summer Olympics.

References

1943 births
1993 deaths
French male cyclists
Olympic cyclists of France
Cyclists at the 1964 Summer Olympics
French Vuelta a España stage winners